

Gottlob Müller (17 March 1895 – 28 April 1945) was a decorated general in the Luftwaffe of Nazi Germany during World War II.  He was a recipient of the Knight's Cross of the Iron Cross which was awarded to recognise extreme battlefield bravery or successful military leadership. Müller was killed during the Battle of Berlin, in the fighting for the Gatow airfield.

Awards and decorations

 Knight's Cross of the Iron Cross on 8 June 1943 as Generalmajor and commanding general and commander-in-chief of Luftgau Tunis

References

Citations

Bibliography

 

1895 births
1945 deaths
People from Kitzingen
Luftwaffe World War II generals
German Army personnel of World War I
Recipients of the Gold German Cross
Recipients of the Knight's Cross of the Iron Cross
Lieutenant generals of the Luftwaffe
German Army personnel killed in World War II
Military personnel from Bavaria